Rabindra Sadan is a cultural centre and theatre in Kolkata, located close to the St. Paul's Cathedral on Acharya Jagadish Chandra Bose Road in South Kolkata.

It is noted for its large stage which is a prime venue for Bengali theatre and Kolkata Film Festival.

It is serviced by Rabindra Sadan metro station of Kolkata Metro on the North-South Corridor. It's close to Central Kolkata.

History 

The foundation stone of Rabindra Sadan was laid by the then Prime Minister of India Jawaharlal Nehru on 5 August 1961. The construction work of the auditorium ended in  October 1967.

It was renovated in 2016.
Rabindrasadan building started in 1961 which is Birth centinary year of Rabindranath Tagore who won Nobel Prize in 1913 as first Indian born Nobel Prize Winner.Rabindrasadan Auditorium have seating capacity around 1200 audience.

Features 
The Rabindra Sadan complex now houses the Rabindra Sadan stage, Nandan, Paschimbanga Bangla Akademi, Gaganendra Pradarshanshala, Sisir Mancha, Nazrul Academy etc.  among other centers of cultural activities.

References

External links

 Rabindra Sadan profile

Theatres in Kolkata
Culture of Kolkata
Tourist attractions in Kolkata
Bengali theatre